Archinti is an Italian surname. Notable people with the surname include:

Aurelio Archinti (1588–1622), Italian Roman Catholic bishop
Luigi Archinti (1825–1902), Italian art historian, art critic, and painter

Italian-language surnames